The Cache la Poudre Wilderness is federally-protected area administered by the U.S. Forest Service, a division of the U.S. Department of Agriculture. It is located on the Canyon Lakes Ranger District on the Roosevelt National Forest in Colorado.

References

IUCN Category Ib
Protected areas of Larimer County, Colorado
Wilderness areas of Colorado
Protected areas established in 1980
Roosevelt National Forest